José Herrera Uslar (born January 4, 1906) was the son of José Manrique and Carolina Herrera Uslar Urbaneja, one of the founding families of the Valley of Caracas and owners of the Hacienda la Vega.

Personal life
Uslar married Clementina Velutini Couturier (1906–1998) and had 3 children: Jose Herrera Velutini, Julio Herrera Velutini, and Christina Herrera. He has 9 grandchildren: Mercedes Clementina, José Henrique, Santiago, Andrés Herrera Titeux, Julio Herrera Velutini, Carlos Alberto Herrera Velutini, Jose Francisco Kolster Herrera, Cristina Herrera Pantin of Kochen, and Andrés Kochen.

Professional life
Uslar was a lawyer who founded, along with Juan Jose Mendoza, Martin Vegas, Manuel Antonio Matos, Francisco Pimentel, and others, the Progressive Republican Party (PRP) in 1936. Its purpose was to fight against extremism, social dissolution, relaxation, and opposing the spread of Marxist ideology in Venezuela.

In 1950, as an Ambassador of Venezuela in Sweden, Uslar organized the transfer of 1,000 war orphans from Switzerland. They arrived to the country in batches of 50 children, and were later brought to the colony of Catia La Mar, where they were adopted by Venezuelan families.

On January 14, 1930 he founded the Basketball Federation of Venezuela.

References 

1906 births
Venezuelan politicians
Year of death missing
Knights Commander of the Order of Merit of the Federal Republic of Germany
Ambassadors of Venezuela